Not a Drum Was Heard is a 1924 American silent Western film directed by William A. Wellman. The title is taken from the first line of Charles Wolfe's poem "The Burial of Sir John Moore after Corunna":

Plot
As described in a film magazine review, Jack Mills and Bud Loupel; they ride the ranch together, rescue each other from certain death, and fall in love with Jean Ross. She selects Bud to be the lucky one. Married life starts in a bungalow acquired on the installment plan from the town banker Rand, who also had courted Jean. Bud obtains employment at the bank as a teller. He falls into a trap set by Rand and steals funds. Jack hears of it, stages a holdup to cover the money, and tries to assume all blame. However, Bud has been mortally wounded and, in the mix-up, exonerates his friend before he dies.

Cast

Preservation
With no prints of Not a Drum Was Heard in any film archives, it is a lost film.

References

External links
 
 

1924 films
Films directed by William A. Wellman
Fox Film films
1924 Western (genre) films
Lost American films
American black-and-white films
Lost Western (genre) films
1924 lost films
Silent American Western (genre) films
1920s American films